Luke Theodore Walton (born March 28, 1980) is an American professional basketball coach and former player who is an assistant coach for the Cleveland Cavaliers of the National Basketball Association (NBA). He played 10 seasons in the NBA as a forward, winning two NBA championships with the Los Angeles Lakers. He also won a title as an assistant coach with the Golden State Warriors before serving as the head coach of the Lakers from 2016 through 2019. Additionally, Walton served as the head coach of the Sacramento Kings from 2019 to 2021.

Walton played college basketball with the Arizona Wildcats. He was a second-team All-American and a two-time first-team all-conference selection in the Pac-10. He was selected in the second round of the 2003 NBA draft by the Lakers. After the 2010 NBA Finals, Walton and his father, Hall of Famer Bill Walton, became the first father and son to have both won multiple NBA championships: Bill won in 1977 and 1986, and Luke in 2009 and 2010. His best season statistically was 2006–07 with over 11 points, 5 rebounds, and over 4 assists per game.

As the Warriors' interim head coach in 2015–16, he guided the team to the longest winning streak to open a season in league history at 24 games.

Early life
The son of Susie and former UCLA star and NBA Hall-of-Famer Bill Walton, Luke Walton was born in San Diego, California. He was named after his father's close friend and former Portland Trail Blazers teammate Maurice Lucas. He has three brothers: Adam, Nathan, and Chris. Walton attended University of San Diego High School in San Diego, California, graduating in 1998.

College career
Walton played basketball at the University of Arizona under coach Lute Olson. A two-time first-team All-Pac-10 selection, his best year statistically was as a junior, when he averaged 15.7 points, 7.3 rebounds, 6.3 assists, 1.6 steals and 0.6 blocks per game. During his senior year he averaged 10.8 points, 5.6 rebounds, 5.1 assists and 0.9 steals per game.

Walton graduated from Arizona in the spring of 2003 after completing work in family studies and human development.

Professional career

Los Angeles Lakers (2003–2012)
Walton was selected by the Los Angeles Lakers in the 2003 NBA draft with the second pick of the second round (32nd overall). Walton was a favorite of Lakers fans during his nine-year stint as a selfless, hard-working reserve player. He was chosen to represent Team Los Angeles in the Shooting Stars Competition during All-Star Weekend in 2005.

In 2006–07, Walton had his best year in the NBA. He scored a career-high 25 points against the Atlanta Hawks on December 8, 2006. For the season he posted career-high per-game averages in minutes, field goal percentage, steals, blocks, rebounds, assists and points as the Lakers starting small forward. Following the season, on July 12, 2007, Walton was signed by the Lakers to a 6-year, $30 million contract. The Lakers then made three straight runs to the NBA Finals; they lost to the Celtics in 2008, but defeated the Magic in 2009 and Celtics in 2010 to win back-to-back championships. This gave Walton two championships as a player, the same amount his father won.

Cleveland Cavaliers (2012–2013)
On March 15, 2012, Walton was traded along with Jason Kapono and a 2012 first-round draft choice to the Cleveland Cavaliers for Ramon Sessions and Christian Eyenga.

A year later would be Walton's final days as an NBA player, as his final game was on April 5th, 2013 in a 97 - 91 victory over the Boston Celtics. In his final game Walton recorded 2 assists in 3 minutes of playing time.

Coaching career

Early coaching career
Walton's first coaching experience was with the University of Memphis, which hired Walton as an assistant coach during the 2011 NBA lockout. He remained an assistant at Memphis until the lockout was over.

Following his retirement Walton was hired as a player development coach by the Los Angeles D-Fenders of the NBA Development League, joining the team in November 2013 for the 2013–14 season.

Golden State Warriors (2014–2016)
The following season in 2014–15, Walton became an assistant coach for the Golden State Warriors. Said Walton, "We are gonna run parts of the triangle offense, and I know that thing front and back." The Warriors won the 2015 NBA Finals after they defeated the Cleveland Cavaliers in six games to give Walton his third NBA championship and first as a coach.

During 2015–16 training camp in October 2015, Walton was appointed as the Warriors interim head coach when Steve Kerr took an indefinite leave of absence to rehabilitate his back that had been bothering him after the NBA Finals. Walton made his coaching debut in the season opener on October 27 in a 111–95 win over the New Orleans Pelicans. Three games later, he presided over the third-largest margin of victory in franchise history when the Warriors defeated the Memphis Grizzlies, 119–69, which was also the largest margin in the league since 1991. The Warriors set a new NBA record by winning their first four games by a total margin of 100 points. With a win over the Los Angeles Lakers on November 24, he guided the Warriors to a 16th consecutive victory to start the season, a new NBA record.

Walton was named the NBA Western Conference Coach of the Month for games played in October and November, after guiding Golden State to a 19–0 start. He received the award despite technically being winless, since the Warriors' record was credited to Kerr. Since Kerr was still the head coach, NBA rules stipulated that the team's record under an interim coach be credited to the head coach, though the league considered altering the rule given Walton's case. However, the NBA permits an interim or acting head coach to be eligible for coaching awards. The Warriors extended their record start to 24–0. They were 39–4, the second-best start in league history, when Kerr resumed coaching full-time on January 22, 2016. Golden State ended the season an NBA-record 73–9, and Kerr was voted the NBA Coach of the Year. The coach had Walton, who coached more games during the season than Kerr (43–39), sit next to him on the podium at the award press conference. Walton finished ninth in the voting, receiving one second-place and two third-place votes.

Los Angeles Lakers (2016–2019)
On April 29, 2016, the Lakers hired Walton to become their new head coach once the Warriors' season ended in the 2016 NBA Finals. He replaced Byron Scott.

In his first season with the Lakers, the team improved upon their franchise worst 17–65 record from the previous year, finishing 26–56. During the season, Mitch Kupchak and Jim Buss were replaced by Magic Johnson and Rob Pelinka. Johnson and Pelinka both spoke highly of Walton and said he would remain the head coach of the team. The Lakers won five of their last six games of the season, bringing some momentum into the off-season.

Walton's second season with the Lakers saw another slight improvement, as the team finished 35–47, its best record since the 2012–13 season.

In 2018–19, the Lakers had high expectations after signing LeBron James to a four-year, $153.3 million contract. Along with James and a core of young prospects, the front office completed the roster with veterans on one-year deals, a group that was rich in ball handlers but lacking in shooters. Johnson initially preached patience during the preseason. After the team started the season 2–5, Johnson reprimanded Walton and demanded immediate results. The Lakers were 20–14 after a Christmas win over Golden State, but James and Rajon Rondo were injured during the game, which began a downturn from which the team never recovered, ending the season 37–45. Combined with season-ending injuries to Lonzo Ball and Brandon Ingram, the combination of James, Ball and Ingram played together for just 23 games, when they were 15–8. As a team, Lakers players missed over 210 games due to injuries, and Walton used more than 25 different starting lineups during the season. Prior to the season finale, Johnson resigned, citing among his reasons that he wished to avoid conflict with owner Jeanie Buss, who supported Walton, while Johnson planned to fire him. Days later on April 12, 2019, Walton and the Lakers agreed to mutually part ways. The Lakers went 98–148 under Walton and missed the playoffs in all three seasons.

Sacramento Kings (2019–2021)
On April 14, 2019, Walton was hired by the Sacramento Kings as their head coach. He and Kings general manager Vlade Divac had been teammates with the Lakers in 2004–05, which was Divac's final NBA season after spending six with Sacramento. The Kings began the 2019–20 season 0–5 after losing forward Marvin Bagley III for weeks when he suffered a broken thumb in the closing minutes of a 29-point, season-opening loss to the Phoenix Suns. Sacramento rebounded from their slow start to win six of their next eight. They ended the season 31–41, and Divac resigned  after the season. The Kings finished 31–41 again in 2020–21, extending the franchise's playoff drought to 15 seasons, which was the longest active streak in the league. On November 21, 2021, the Kings fired Walton after a 6–11 start to the 2021–22 season. He was 68–93 in his two-plus seasons with the team.

Cleveland Cavaliers (2022–present)
On May 31, 2022, the Cleveland Cavaliers hired Walton as an assistant coach on J.B. Bickerstaff's staff.

Broadcasting career
Walton was hired by Spectrum SportsNet (known then as Time Warner Cable SportsNet) in 2013 to join their Lakers on-air broadcast team.

Personal life
In December 2008, a woman named Stacy Elizabeth Beshear pleaded no contest to charges of stalking Walton. At one point, she pulled up to Walton's car and "pretended to fire gunshots at him with her hand." She was sentenced to three years' probation, told to attend weekly counseling sessions for a year and ordered to stay away for three years from Walton's home and from the Lakers' games and practices.

In 2009, Walton and his father became the third father-son duo to both win NBA championships as players, following the Guokases (Matt Sr. and Matt Jr.) and the Barrys (Rick and Brent). The Waltons later became the first father-son duo to each win multiple NBA titles.

Walton married long-time girlfriend Bre Ladd in 2013. The two met in 2002 at the University of Arizona, where she played volleyball on their varsity team, and started dating in 2005. They have two children.

On April 22, 2019, former Spectrum SportsNet host Kelli Tennant filed a civil lawsuit against Walton, accusing him of sexual assault. They had appeared on the network together during Walton's brief broadcasting stint. She published a book in 2014, which credits him as being the author of the foreword, which he later denied writing. She alleged that the assault occurred afterwards, when she dropped off a copy of the book to Walton in a hotel in Santa Monica, California, while he was an assistant with Golden State. According to Tennant, he invited her to his room, where he pinned her on the bed. He kissed her face, neck and chest and groped her breasts and groin area. She said he later rubbed his erection against her leg. Walton denied the charges; he acknowledged their meeting at the hotel, but wrote in court filings that "their encounter was very short, entirely pleasant and consensual." The Kings and the NBA launched a joint investigation into her claims against Walton. In August, the investigators concluded that there was "not a sufficient basis to support" the accusations. Tennant declined to participate in the investigation. On December 5, the lawsuit was dropped at her request, with records showing it was dismissed "with prejudice", meaning she cannot re-file. It was not known whether a settlement was reached.

NBA career statistics

Regular season

|-
| style="text-align:left;"|
| style="text-align:left;"|L.A. Lakers
| 72 || 2 || 10.1 || .425 || .333 || .705 || 1.8 || 1.6 || .4 || .1 || 2.4
|-
| style="text-align:left;"|
| style="text-align:left;"|L.A. Lakers
| 61 || 5 || 12.6 || .411 || .262 || .708 || 2.3 || 1.5 || .4 || .2 || 3.2
|-
| style="text-align:left;"|
| style="text-align:left;"|L.A. Lakers
| 69 || 6 || 19.3 || .412 || .327 || .750 || 3.6 || 2.3 || .6 || .2 || 5.0
|-
| style="text-align:left;"|
| style="text-align:left;"|L.A. Lakers
| 60 || 60 || 33.0 || .474 || .387 || .745 || 5.0 || 4.3 || 1.0 || .4 || 11.4
|-
| style="text-align:left;"|
| style="text-align:left;"|L.A. Lakers
| 74 || 31 || 23.4 || .450 || .333 || .706 || 3.9 || 2.9 || .8 || .2 || 7.2
|-
| style="text-align:left; background:#afe6ba;"|†
| style="text-align:left;"| L.A. Lakers
| 65 || 34 || 17.9 || .436 || .298 || .719 || 2.8 || 2.7 || .5 || .2 || 5.0
|-
| style="text-align:left; background:#afe6ba;"|†
| style="text-align:left;"| L.A. Lakers
| 29 || 0 || 9.4 || .357 || .412 || .500 || 1.3 || 1.4 || .3 || .0 || 2.4
|-
| style="text-align:left;"|
| style="text-align:left;"|L.A. Lakers
| 54 || 0 || 9.0 || .328 || .235 || .700 || 1.2 || 1.1 || .2 || .1 || 1.7
|-
| style="text-align:left;"|
| style="text-align:left;"|L.A. Lakers
| 9 || 0 || 7.2 || .429 || .000 || .000 || 1.6 || .6 || .2 || .0 || 1.3
|-
| style="text-align:left;"|
| style="text-align:left;"|Cleveland
| 21 || 0 || 14.2 || .353 || .438 || .000 || 1.7 || 1.4 || .1 || .0 || 2.0
|-
| style="text-align:left;"|
| style="text-align:left;"|Cleveland
| 50 || 0 || 17.1 || .392 || .299 || .500 || 2.9 || 3.3 || .8 || .3 || 3.4
|- class="sortbottom"
| style="text-align:center;" colspan="2"|Career
| 564 || 138 || 17.2 || .429 || .326 || .715 || 2.8|| 2.3 || .6 || .2 || 4.7

Playoffs

|-
| style="text-align:left;"|2004
| style="text-align:left;"|L.A. Lakers
| 17 || 0 || 7.9 || .345 || .385 || .700 || 1.3 || 1.5 || .4 || .1 || 1.9
|-
| style="text-align:left;"|2006
| style="text-align:left;"|L.A. Lakers
| 7 || 7 || 33.6 || .458 || .364 || 1.000 || 6.4 || 1.7 || 1.0 || .1 || 12.1
|-
| style="text-align:left;"|2007
| style="text-align:left;"|L.A. Lakers
| 5 || 5 || 25.6 || .389 || .417 || .750 || 4.2 || 2.6 || 1.4 || .2 || 7.2
|-
| style="text-align:left;"|2008
| style="text-align:left;"|L.A. Lakers
| 21 || 0 || 16.8 || .454 || .423 || .722 || 2.6 || 2.0 || .5 || .2 || 6.0
|-
| style="text-align:left; background:#afe6ba;"|2009†
| style="text-align:left;"|L.A. Lakers
|21 || 0 || 15.8 || .427 || .313 || .611 || 2.5 || 2.1 || .7 || .1 || 3.8
|-
| style="text-align:left; background:#afe6ba;"|2010†
| style="text-align:left;"|L.A. Lakers
| 16 || 0 || 6.0 || .304 || .222 || .500 || .5 || .9 || .1 || .1 || 1.1
|-
| style="text-align:left;"|2011
| style="text-align:left;"|L.A. Lakers
| 1 || 0 || 4.0 || .000 || .000 || .000 || 1.0 || .0 || .0 || .0 || .0
|- class="sortbottom"
| style="text-align:center;" colspan="2"|Career
| 88 || 12 || 14.6 || .420 || .360 || .701 || 2.3 || 1.7 || .5 || .1 || 4.3

Head coaching record

|-
| style="text-align:left;"|L.A. Lakers
| style="text-align:left;"|
| 82 || 26 || 56 ||  || 4th in Pacific || — || — || — || — || Missed playoffs
|-
| style="text-align:left;"|L.A. Lakers
| style="text-align:left;"|
| 82 || 35 || 47 ||  || 3rd in Pacific || — || — || — || — || Missed playoffs
|-
| style="text-align:left;"|L.A. Lakers
| style="text-align:left;"|
| 82 || 37 || 45 ||  || 4th in Pacific || — || — || — || — || Missed playoffs
|-
| style="text-align:left;"|Sacramento
| style="text-align:left;"|
| 72 || 31 || 41 ||  || 4th in Pacific || — || — || — || — || Missed playoffs
|-
| style="text-align:left;"|Sacramento
| style="text-align:left;"|
| 72 || 31 || 41 ||  || 5th in Pacific || — || — || — || — || Missed playoffs
|-
| style="text-align:left;"|Sacramento
| style="text-align:left;"|
| 17 || 6 || 11 ||  || (fired) || — || — || — || — || —
|- class="sortbottom"
| style="text-align:center;" colspan="2"|Career
| 407 || 166 || 241 ||  ||   || — || — || — || — ||

References

External links

1980 births
Living people
All-American college men's basketball players
American men's basketball players
Arizona Wildcats men's basketball players
Basketball coaches from California
Basketball players from Los Angeles
Basketball players from San Diego
Cleveland Cavaliers players
Golden State Warriors assistant coaches
Los Angeles D-Fenders coaches
Los Angeles Lakers draft picks
Los Angeles Lakers head coaches
Los Angeles Lakers players
Memphis Tigers men's basketball coaches
Sacramento Kings head coaches
Small forwards
University of San Diego High School alumni